Barcelona Esporte Clube, commonly known as Barcelona, is a Brazilian football club based in Rio de Janeiro, Rio de Janeiro state.

History
The club was founded on December 5, 1999, the club being named after Fútbol Club Barcelona of Spain. They competed in their first professional competition in 2000, in the Campeonato Carioca Fourth Level, finishing in the seventh place, and then they competed in the Campeonato Carioca Second Level in 2001.

Stadium
Barcelona Esporte Clube play their home games at Estádio Barcelona Esporte Clube. The stadium has a maximum capacity of 5,000 people.

References

Association football clubs established in 1999
Football clubs in Rio de Janeiro (state)
1999 establishments in Brazil